Patrick Gray may refer to:
 J. Patrick Gray, American anthropologist
 L. Patrick Gray (1916–2005), former Director of the FBI
 Patrick Gray, 4th Lord Gray (died 1584)
 Patrick Gray, 5th Lord Gray (died 1608), Scottish landowner 
 Patrick Gray, 6th Lord Gray (died 1612)
 Paddy Gray (footballer) (1872–?), Scottish footballer